Dave Greszczyszyn (born September 18, 1979) is a Canadian skeleton racer who has competed since 2007. Greszczyszyn is a two-time Canadian national champion, had four top-10 finishes in the 2014–15 Skeleton World Cup, and finished 11th at the 2015 FIBT World Championships. He also won five races in the Skeleton-Europacup.

Career
In 2008, Greszczyszyn earned a spot on the North American Cup Circuit and moved to Calgary to train full-time. After competing for three years in North America, he earned a spot on the Europa Cup team and finished second overall. The 2012–13 season was his first year on the Canadian national team; he finished third overall on the Intercontinental Cup circuit. He earned a spot on the World Cup squad in 2013 and now is a part-time substitute teacher in Calgary.

Personal life
Dave was originally from Brampton. He played rugby at Brock University, and obtained a Masters of Teaching degree in Australia. Dave was a full-time teacher at Mayfield Secondary School
in Caledon, Ontario until deciding to pursue skeleton full-time.

References

External links

Full career results (in French)

1979 births
Canadian male skeleton racers
Living people
Skeleton racers at the 2018 Winter Olympics
Sportspeople from Brampton
Olympic skeleton racers of Canada
20th-century Canadian people
21st-century Canadian people